Events from the year 1712 in Sweden

Incumbents
 Monarch – Charles XII

Events

 30 February 1712 – Sweden temporarily adopts February 30 as a day to adjust the Swedish Calendar back to the Julian calendar. 
 December 9 – Battle of Gadebusch: Sweden defeats Denmark and Saxony.

 
 

 
 
 The queen dowager's favorite Anna Catharina von Bärfelt is arrested and tried.

Births

 31 March - Anders Johan von Höpken, politician (died 1789) 
 July 19- Carl Fredrik Mennander, archbishop  (died 1786) 
 Peter Lindahl, actor  (died 1792) 
 Sophia Schröder, concert soprano  (died 1750) 
 Brita Laurelia, publicist, book printer, and poet (died 1784)

Deaths

 
 
 
 unknown - Juliana Schierberg, royal favorite (born year unknown)
 - Christina Eleonora Drakenhielm, Catholic convert  (died 1649)

References

 
Years of the 18th century in Sweden
Sweden